Mahindra Truck and Bus Division, formerly called Mahindra Navistar / Mahindra International, is an Indian commercial vehicle manufacturer formed in 2005 from a joint-venture between Navistar International (49%) of the United States and Indian automobile maker Mahindra & Mahindra (51%). It has been demerged into Mahindra & Mahindra ltd and became a separate division.

Mahindra Truck and Bus Division's Head office is located at Chinchwad, Pune and its manufacturing line is inside Mahindra Vehicles Manufacturers Ltd., Chakan, Pune.

Products

HCV 

 BlazoX 28 (28T GVW, Truck, Tipper, 276 hp)
 BlazoX 35 (35T GVW, Truck, Tipper, 276 hp)
 BlazoX 40 (39T GVW, Tractor Trailer, 276 hp)
 BlazoX 42 (42T GVW, Truck, 276 hp)
 BlazoX 46 (45T GVW, Tractor Trailer, 276 hp)
 BlazoX 49 (49T GVW, Truck, 276 hp)
 BlazoX 55 (55T GVW, Tractor Trailer, 276 hp)

ICV 

 Furio 11 (11T GVW, Truck, 138 hp)
 Furio 12 (12T GVW, Truck, 138 hp)
 Furio 14 (14T GVW, Truck, 138 hp)
 Furio 14HD (13T GVW, Truck, 138 hp)
 Furio 16 (16T GVW, Truck, 138 hp)
 Furio 17 (17T GVW, Truck, 138 hp)

LCV 

 Furio 7 (7T GVW, Truck, 81 hp)
 Furio 7HD (7T GVW, Truck, Tipper, 122 hp)
 Jayo (5T GVW, Truck, 80 hp)

Bus 

 Cruzio (12-51 seat, 80-128 hp)

 Cruzio Grande (32-72 seat, 138 hp)

Other initiatives 
In 2016, the Mahindra Truck and Bus Division announced a joined road safety initiative with the Ministry of Road Transport and Highways, the national #HaveaSafeJourney (#HASJ) awareness campaign. This involved a writing contest for 30 short stories related to road safety issues, which the following year were published as a book. Among notable writers contributing to the book were Tuhin Sinha, who also acted as project advisor, Kiran Manral and Pankaj Dubey.

References

Truck manufacturers of India
Bus manufacturers of India
Manufacturing companies based in Pune
2005 establishments in Maharashtra
Indian companies established in 2005
Manufacturing companies established in 2005